Duke Gwangpyeong (1083–1170), personal name Wang Won (왕원, 王源) was a Goryeo Royal family member as the grandson of King Munjong, also a politician and physician who firstly honoured as Count Gwangpyeong before became a "Marquess" or "Duke" later.

Biography

Early life and relative
Born as the second son of Wang Do, Duke Joseon (조선공 왕도) who was the eldest son of King Munjong and Consort Ingyeong in 1083, he was named Won (원, 源). His mother was the second daughter of Yi Jeong (이정) from the Incheon Yi clan. He had an older brother and a younger brother who would become the father of Queen Janggyeong, Queen Uijeong, and Queen Seonjeong.

Role in the Royal court
In 1086 (3rd years reign of King Seonjong), Wang Won was appointed as Geomgyosagongjuguk (검교사공주국, 檢校司空柱國) and later became Euncheonggwangnokdaebu (은청광록대부, 銀靑光祿大夫) and Sutaebu (수태부, 守太傅).

During the reign of King Sukjong, Wang Won became Geomgyosaso Susagong (검교사도 수사공, 檢校司徒守司空) and Suchunggongsin Teukjingeomgyotaewi Susado (수충공신 특진검교태위 수사도, 輸忠功臣特進檢校太慰守司徒) in 1103. He also received Sukjong's 3rd daughter, Princess Ansu as his wife, honoured as Count Gwangpyeong (광평백, 廣平伯) and promoted into Gaebuuidongsamsa (개부의동삼사, 開府儀同三司) in 1111 (6th years reign of King Yejong). Together, they had a son who would marry Yejong's 2nd daughter, Princess Heunggyeong.

During the reign of King Injong, Wang Won became Marquess Gwangpyeong (광평후, 廣平侯) and later the Duke Gwangpyeong (광평공, 廣平公) while held the position of Sutaebo (수태보, 守太保).

Role in religion and medicine
During his lifetime, Wang Won was said to well versed in both of Confucianism and Buddhism, excellent in medicine (의술, 醫術) and used his ability to widely take care and treat peoples. From a middle age, he fascinated with Buddhism and always read the Lotus Sutra (법화경, 法華經), which believed that he kept nearly 10,000 copies in his own mansion.

Death, funeral, and legacy
In 1170 (24th years reign of King Uijong), Duke Gwangpyeong fell ill and died at the age 88 in the private residence of the Buddha (불령, 佛嶺), which inherited from his mother and then buried at the western of Baegak Mountain foot a year later. There was an "Epitaph of Wang Won" (왕원묘지명, 王源墓誌銘) that written not long after his death.

References

Wang Won on Encykorea .
Wang Won on Doosan Encyclopedia .

1083 births
1170 deaths
11th-century Korean people
12th-century Korean people